Whitaker Center for Science and the Arts is located in Harrisburg, Pennsylvania. The center is the first complex of its kind in the United States to use science as an entry to the arts. Whitaker Center exhibits science, the performing arts, and a digital cinema under one roof.

History
In September 1997, ground was broken on the corner of Third and Market Streets in the heart of downtown Harrisburg and the Whitaker Center for Science and the Arts, a $52.7 million public-private partnership, was born.

The Whitaker Foundation and the Helen F. Whitaker Fund have contributed over $8 million to the center. Whitaker Center for Science and the Arts is named in memory of the founder of AMP Incorporated (now TE Connectivity), Uncas A. Whitaker and his wife Helen F. Whitaker, in recognition of these grants.

The National Science Foundation awarded the center a major grant in support of a permanent exhibit for the new Science Center. "Bodies In Motion: The Physics of Dance" explores the physics of human movement, especially dance, gymnastics and ice-skating. This is one of the flagship exhibits for the Science Center.

Whitaker Center attractions

Select Medical Digital Cinema (formerly Select Medical IMAX Theater) is a large-format cinema arts theater which primarily focuses on educational films. It was an IMAX theater until 2014, when it was upgraded to a more cost-effective digital system. During its operation, it was the only IMAX theater in the Central Pennsylvania region.

Harsco Science Center has three floors and features more than 240 exhibits that explore physical science, natural science, life science, mathematics and technology. There are also limited-engagement exhibits.

Sunoco Performance Theater showcases 696 seats within the Orchestra, Mezzanine, and Balcony levels. The theater's design features 14 theater boxes over those levels. Currently, there are seven resident companies at the theater: Central Pennsylvania Youth Ballet, Harrisburg Choral Society, Harrisburg Opera Association, Market Square Concerts, Susquehanna Chorale, Theatre Harrisburg and The Wednesday Club.

References

Museums in Harrisburg, Pennsylvania
Science museums in Pennsylvania
Performing arts centers in Pennsylvania
Performing arts in Harrisburg, Pennsylvania
Defunct IMAX venues
Whitaker Center